Our Lady of Good Counsel is a title given to the Blessed Virgin Mary, after a painting said to be miraculous, now found in the thirteenth century Augustinian church at Genazzano, near Rome, Italy. Measuring  the image is a fresco executed on a thin layer of plaster no thicker than an egg shell. Over the centuries, devotions to Our Lady of the Good Counsel grew among saints and Popes, to the extent that a reference to it was added to the Litany of Loreto and the devotion spread throughout the world. Her feast day is 26 April.

Background
In appreciation, a church, called Santa Maria, was built in Genazzano and was later entrusted to the Augustinian Order in 1356. The Genazzano church became a popular place of pilgrimage. Numerous cures were said to take place there. The Augustinian friars were invited to minister to the spiritual needs of the pilgrims. They continue to serve there to this day.

Legend

According to tradition, the story is said to have begun in 1467. By then the church was in dire need of repair. A local widow, Petruccia, was dedicated to the restoration project, but ran out of funds before the task was completed. 

In the midst of the festivities for the Feast of Saint Mark, the townfolk suddenly heard "exquisite music." A mysterious cloud was then said to have descended on the unfinished wall of the parish church. In front of the people, the cloud dissipated and a beautiful fresco, no thicker than a carte-de-visite and no more than eighteen inches square, of the Virgin Mary and the Christ Child was revealed. It was widely believed that it had been miraculously transported from a church in Scutari, Albania just prior to its invasion by the Ottomans.
 
The picture of Our Lady was at first called "La Madonna del Paradiso" and now better known as "Madonna del Buon Consiglio" (Our Lady of Good Counsel).

Such was the holy image's reputation that Pope Urban VIII made a "glittering" pilgrimage there in 1630, invoking the protection of the Queen of Heaven, as did Pope Pius IX in 1864. On 17 November 1682, Pope Innocent XI had the picture solemnly crowned. Among her noted clients have been St Aloysius Gonzaga, St Alphonsus Liguori, St John Bosco, and Blessed Stephen Bellesini.

History
Art experts consulted during a restoration conducted between 1957 and 1959 suggest that the image of the Madonna was once part of a larger fresco that covered the wall and was subsequently covered over with plaster. They believe the fresco is likely the work of the early fifteenth century artist Gentile da Fabriano, probably painted around the time of Pope Martin V (1417-1431).

Veneration
The Augustinian Order contributed to the spread of this devotion internationally. In 1753, Pope Benedict XIV established the Pious Union of Our Lady of Good Counsel. Leo XIII, who was himself a member of the pious union, was deeply attached to this devotion.
 
On 22 April 1903, Pope Leo XIII included the invocation "Mater boni consilii" in the Litany of Loreto. In 1939, Venerable Pope Pius XII placed his pontificate under the maternal care of Our Lady of Good Counsel and composed a prayer to her.

Through the years, various institutions have been named in honor of Mary under the title of Our Lady of Good Counsel. These institutions include a college, high schools, and churches.

Her Feast is celebrated on 26 April so as not to conflict with that of St. Mark.

The White Scapular

The small Scapular of Our Lady of Good Counsel (the White Scapular) was presented by the Hermits of St Augustine to Pope Leo XIII, who, on 19–21 December 1893, approved it and endowed it with indulgences in a Decree of the Congregation of Rites.

On the front panel of the sacramental (to be made of white wool) is the image of the fresco of Our Lady of Good Counsel, with the inscription, "Mater boni consilii [ora pro nobis]."  On the second segment is found the papal coat-of-arms, which includes the Triple Tiara and the Keys of Heaven, with the words of Leo XIII:  "" (Child, listen to her counsels).

Patronage
Our Lady of Good Counsel is the Patroness of the Missionary Sisters of Saint Peter Claver, the National Council of Catholic Women, and of the Catholic Women's League of Canada.

The "Midwest Augustinians" headquartered in Chicago have also adopted Our Lady of Good Counsel as their patroness, having named their Augustinian jurisdiction as the "Province of Our Mother of Good Counsel."

The town Essen in the German Ruhr- Area is under the patronage of the Lady. The High church the Münster of Essen as it is called was given to her after the Ruhrbistum was established.

See also 
 Marian art in the Catholic Church

References

Bibliography 
 The Virgin Mother of Good Counsel, by Monsignor George F. Dillon, M. H. Gill and Son, 1888.
 The Mother of Good Counsel of Genazzano, by João S. Clá Dias, Western Hemisphere Cultural Society, Inc, 1992. 
 Miraculous Images of Our Lady, by Joan Carroll Cruz, OCDS, TAN Books and Publishers, Inc, 1993.

External links 

 "Our Mother of Good Counsel", Augustinians -Province of St. Thomas of Villanova
 "Our Mother of Good Counsel", Augustinian Friends -discussion of discovery of underlying fresco.

Scapulars
Titles of Mary
Paintings of the Virgin Mary
Catholic devotions